Pagla Kahin Ka (Such a Fool) is a 1970 Indian Hindi-language romance film directed by Shakti Samanta. It stars Shammi Kapoor, Asha Parekh, Helen and Prem Chopra, all of whom had earlier starred in the huge hit Teesri Manzil (1966). The film is well known for the  Mohammed Rafi and Lata Mangeshkar's song "Tum Mujhe Yun Bhula Na Paaoge". The film's music is by Shankar Jaikishan.

Plot 
Sujit (Shammi Kapoor) started having mental problems when he was six years old after visiting his dad, Ajit, at a mental asylum. Thereafter, he kept on getting into trouble, and even ran away from the orphanage. Years later, a musician and singer, Shyam (Prem Chopra), finds Sujit singing on the roadside, and decides to hire him as a singer in a nightclub. This is where Sujit meets dancer, Jenny (Helen), and both fall in love with each other. When they announce their plans to get married, the news does not augur well with the nightclub's owner, Max. An argument ensues, Max draws a gun, and Shyam ends up killing Max. Sujit decides to take the blame and is arrested by the police. In order to escape the gallows, he feigns insanity, and is ordered to be admitted to a mental asylum until he recovers. In the asylum, he is placed under the compassionate care of Dr. Shalini (Asha Parekh) and about a year later is discharged. He returns to the nightclub just in time for Jenny's and Shyam's engagement party. Baffled, confused and angered at this betrayal, he really does go insane and ends up being re-admitted in the very same asylum. But this time his chances of recovery are very slim as he has retreated deep into the inner recesses of his mind - from where he may never return. Even though Helen does her usual cabaret dance number in this film, it still contains one of her most dramatic roles, as she plays a rape victim.

Cast
 Shammi Kapoor as Sujit
 Asha Parekh as Dr. Shalini
 Prem Chopra as Shyam
 Helen as Jenny
 Murad as Judge 
 Manmohan Krishna as Head of the Mental Hospital
 K. N. Singh as Nightclub Owner (as Max)
 Sunder as Inmate
 Sajjan as Inmate (as Ramu Dada)
 Viju Khote
 Brahm Bhardwaj as Advocate S.K. Mehta (as Brahma Bhardwaj) 
 Birbal as Inmate - Maharaja 
 Mohan Choti as Inmate
 Polson as Inmate

Soundtrack

Crew
 Produced by Ajit Chakraborty
 Original Music by
 Jaikishan Dayabhai Panchal   (as Jaikishan)
 Shankarsinh Raghuvanshi   (as Shankar)
 Cinematography by V. Gopi Krishna
 Film Editing by Govind Dalwadi
 Art Direction by Shanti Dass
 Costume Design by Sudha Parekh, Leena Shah
 Makeup Department
 Dinu Indulkar ....  key makeup artist
 Kasinath More ....  makeup department head
 Perin Pereira ....  hair stylist
 Khurshid Ramwala ....  hair stylist
 Bhikubhai Rathod ....  assistant makeup artist
 Ram Tipnis ....  key makeup artist
 Production Management
 A.K. Tiwari ....  production manager
 Second Unit Director or Assistant Director
 Harish Khatri ....  assistant director
 Dinesh Saxena ....  assistant director
 Art Department
 Madhukar S. Shinde ....  assistant art director
 Dilip Singh ....  assistant art director
 Gurudayal Singh ....  assistant art director
 
 Camera and Electrical Department
 R.M. Bhalla ....  assistant camera
 N.G. Rao ....  assistant camera
 V. Subbarao ....  assistant camera
 
 Costume and Wardrobe Department
 Chelaram ....  costumes
 Mani J. Rabadi ....  costumes
 
 Editorial Department
 Bijoy Chowdhary ....  assistant editor
 M.T. Gupte ....  assistant editor
 
 Music Department
 Asha Bhosle ....  playback singer
 S. H. Bihari ....  lyrics
 Manna Dey ....  playback singer
 Sebastian D'Souza ....  assistant to composer
 Hasrat Jaipuri ....  lyrics
 Lata Mangeshkar ....  playback singer
 Mohammed Rafi ....  playback singer: "Tum Mujhe yun Bhula Na Paoge"
 Brahmanand Sharma ....  background music
 Dattaram Wadkar ....  assistant to composer
 
 Other crew
 Herman Benjamin ....  dances
 N.C. Nanda ....  production controller

Reception
The Indian Express wrote, "the film is as bad as one can expect any film with Shammi Kapoor and Asha Parekh to be". The film wasn't a box office hit. Leading lady Asha Parekh said audiences didn't want to see Shammi Kapoor play a madman.  Nevertheless, the film remains one of her personal favorites, calling it a "beautiful film."  In her 2017 memoir "The Hit Girl", she wrote that Shammi Kapoor loved the song "Tum Mujhe Yun Bhula Na Paaoge" so much that in his later years, he used it as a ringtone for his cellphone.  It's also one of her personal favorite songs, and she said she felt privileged to have Lata Mangeshkar's version picturized on her.  The song was played at Lata Mangeshkar's funeral in 2022.
Director Shakti Samanta liked Parekh's performance so much that he cast her again in Kati Patang (1970), which became a hit, and which won her Filmfare Best Actress Award.  Her co-star Helen also holds a special place in her heart for the film, since she called it a "very nice film."  Actor Kamal Haasan wanted to star in the Tamil remake and asked Mani Ratnam to direct it, but Ratnam wasn't interested.

References

External links
 

1970 films
Films scored by Shankar–Jaikishan
1970s Hindi-language films
Films directed by Shakti Samanta
Films about mental health